The  is a "Romancecar" limited express train operated by Odakyu Electric Railway between Shinjuku Station and Katase-Enoshima Station.

Route
 Shinjuku Station - Shin-Yurigaoka Station - Sagami-Ōno Station - Yamato Station - Fujisawa Station - Katase-Enoshima Station

Rolling stock
 Odakyu 30000 series EXE

Rolling stock used in the past
 Odakyu 3000 series SE
 Odakyu 3100 series NSE
 Odakyu 10000 series HiSE
 Odakyu 7000 series LSE

External links
 Odakyu Electric Railway website 

Odakyu Electric Railway
Odakyū Enoshima Line
Named passenger trains of Japan
Railway services introduced in 1964
1964 establishments in Japan